Lukas Ammann (29 September 1912 – 3 May 2017) was a Swiss actor who appeared mainly in German and Swiss films and television shows. He  continued to work steadily for over 60 years. He is best known for his title role in the German television series Graf Yoster.

Early life
Lukas Amann's mother was a singer and his father a painter. After he saw Schiller's The Robbers at grammar school in Basel, he aspired to be an actor. Starting in 1933 he attended the acting school of Max Reinhardt in Berlin. In 1934, he left Germany with Heinrich Gretler for Switzerland. Because of his Jewish mother, he was discriminated against even in Switzerland. In the beginning he worked in St. Gallen and later at the Schauspielhaus Zürich with Therese Giehse. In 1948, he participated under Kurt Hirschfeld in the role of the attorney in the premiere of Herr Puntila und sein Knecht Matti. After World War II, Ammann belonged to the Ensemble of the theatre Kleine Freiheit in Munich. Guest performances and tours led him to stages in Austria, Scandinavia and the USA.

Cinematic career
Ammann began his film career in the 1939 Swiss movie Constable Studer after the novel of Friedrich Glauser, starring Heinrich Gretler. Beginning in the 1950s, he was successful especially on German Television. In 1961, he played in the series Gestatten, mein Name ist Cox with Günter Pfitzmann and Paul Edwin Roth.

In 1966, Ammann played in the first color-TV series Adrian der Tulpendieb. On top of that he appeared in series like Das Kriminalmuseum, Der Forellenhof and Der Kommissar. In 1973, the horror movie Mark of the Devil Part II depicted him as tortured to death.

Between 1967 and 1977 he achieved great popularity in his most famous role in the German detective series Graf Yoster, where he played the main part of the same name.

From 1994 to 2000, Ammann played a family patriarch in the television series Die Fallers. In 1998, he played a purported survivor of the Holocaust in Dani Levy's film Meschugge. In 2005, at age 92, he played Abi Golstein in Micha Lewinsky's Swiss short film Herr Goldstein. It won an award for best Swiss short film at the Locarno International Film Festival. Ammann lent his voice in German dubbing Peter Sellers (in John and Julie, 1955) and Lucky Luke (in the animated film Daisy Town, 1971).

In 2013, he worked again, aged 101, with the director Ronnie R. Vogt on the movie Reunion Solitaire.

Personal life
Lukas Ammann lived in Munich. After two failed marriages, he married German soprano Liselotte Ebnet in 1959; she died in 2009. As of 2015, he still ran his household by himself and also drove his car. He died in May 2017 at the age of 104 from complications from surgery.

Filmography

See also
 List of centenarians (actors, filmmakers and entertainers)

References

External links
 

1912 births
2017 deaths
Swiss Jews
Swiss male film actors
Swiss centenarians
Swiss male television actors
20th-century Swiss male actors
21st-century Swiss male actors
Jewish male actors
Men centenarians
Swiss expatriates in Germany